Oleksiy Prytulyak (born 12 January 1989) is a Ukrainian professional footballer.

External links
 
 
 

1989 births
Living people
Footballers from Zhytomyr
Ukrainian footballers
Association football midfielders
Ukrainian expatriate footballers
Expatriate footballers in Belarus
Expatriate footballers in Poland
FC Shakhtar Donetsk players
FC Shakhtar-3 Donetsk players
FC Dnipro Cherkasy players
FC Dnepr Mogilev players
FC Nyva Ternopil players
FC Skala Stryi (2004) players
SC Tavriya Simferopol players
FC Prykarpattia Ivano-Frankivsk (2004) players
FC Stal Kamianske players
PFC Sumy players
FC Inhulets Petrove players
Chełmianka Chełm players
Olimpia Elbląg players
Elana Toruń players
FC Rubikon Kyiv players